The Ministry of Justice of Sudan was created in 1956 by Mohammed Ahmed Abu Ranat and Ahmed Metwally al-Atabani (who became a judiciary head and deputy general respectively after the country's independence from Anglo-Egyptian rule). In 1983, the ministry's responsibilities were clearly defined to include representing the state in legal affairs, reviewing and reforming laws that promote justice, and other functions.

List of ministers 

 'Ali 'Abd al-Rahman (1954–1955)
Ziada Osman Arbab (1956–1964)
Rashid al-Tahir (1964–1965)
Mamoun Sinada (1966–1968)
Rashid al-Tahir (1968–1969)
Amin al-Tahir al-Shibli (1969–1971)
 Ahmad Sulayman (1971–1973)
Hasan al-Turabi (1988–1989)
Hasan Ishma'il al-Bili (1989–1990)
Ahmad Mahmud Hassan (1991–1992)
Abdallah Idris (1992–1993)
Abd El-Aziz Shiddo (1993–1996)
 'Abd al-Basit Sabdarat (1996–1997)
 'Ali Muhammed 'Uthman Yasin (1998–2005)
 Mohamed Ali Al-Mardi (2006–2007)
 'Abd Al-Basit Sabdarat (2007–2010)
 Mohammed Bushara Dousa (2010–2017)
 Idris Ibrahim Jameel (2017–2019)
Nasredeen Abdulbari (also: Nasr-Eddin Abdul-Bari, Nasr al-Din Abdel Bari) (2019–present)

See also 

 Justice ministry
 Politics of Sudan

References 

Sudan Political Service officers
Government ministries of Sudan